Andrea Boltz (born 2 February 1969) is a Mexican rower. She competed in the women's lightweight double sculls event at the 1996 Summer Olympics.

References

External links
 

1969 births
Living people
Mexican female rowers
Olympic rowers of Mexico
Rowers at the 1996 Summer Olympics
Place of birth missing (living people)
Pan American Games bronze medalists for Mexico
Medalists at the 1995 Pan American Games
Rowers at the 1995 Pan American Games
Pan American Games medalists in rowing